Dreamcatchers is a travel documentary television series created and presented by Philippe Estiot and Iva Agüero in collaboration with Malaysian production company Trifecta Collective. The series is a quest for "dreamcatchers", people that have changed their life to pursue a dream. Throughout the series, Dreamcatchers showcases the local culture of each destination as the search expands across Southeast Asia.

Dreamcatchers season one was filmed in Indonesia, first premiered in July 2017 and went on to air in over 45 countries worldwide. The first season of the series was named a National Winner in the Asian Academy Creative Awards and represented Malaysia in the Best Non-Scripted Entertainment category.

Dreamcatchers season two premiered on May 9, 2019, with episodes filmed in East Malaysia.

Dreamcatchers season three was shot entirely in the Philippines and premiered in October 2019 on ABS-CBN's Metro Channel, before continuing to air around the globe. The "Malapacao" episode from Dreamcatchers season three was named a National Winner in the Asian Academy Creative Awards and represented The Philippines in the Best Lifestyle Programme category.

Premise 
Dreamcatchers is a factual entertainment series where each episode introduces a different "dreamcatcher" character and their story. The episodes begin with Phil and Iva traveling from one destination to another in search of a "dreamcatcher" to interview.  As they seek out dreamcatchers, Phil and Iva also become immersed in the local culture of a region, exploring food, learning about traditions and learning from the local people.

Production 
Dreamcatchers is produced by Phiva Prod (formerly Phil & Iva Productions Sdn. Bhd.) a full-service production company registered in Malaysia. Philippe Estiot and Iva Agüero founded the production company. While Dreamcatchers is still the company's main production, today they also produce commissioned shows for cable television, feature-length documentaries and corporate videos.

Distribution 
Dreamcatchers is currently distributed by kwanza, a premium factual-specialist distribution and production company operating globally. The series has aired in over fifty countries worldwide on cable television channels. Some examples include:

 OutsideTV (USA)
 Canal Off (Brasil)
 Metro Channel (Philippines)
 True Visions (Thailand)
 My Zen TV (Europe, Russia, Canada)
 La Effe (Italy)
 Canal Viajar (Spain)
 EPT3 (Greece)

Series Overview

Season Three (2019)

Season Two (2018)

Season One (2017)

References

External links
 

2010s Malaysian television series